Melinda Patrice "Mindy" Clarke (born April 24, 1969) is an American actress. Clarke is known for portraying Faith Taylor on the soap opera Days of Our Lives (1989–1990), Julie Cooper on Fox's teen drama series The O.C. (2003–2007), Lady Heather on CBS's crime drama series CSI: Crime Scene Investigation (2001–2015) and Amanda on the action thriller series Nikita (2010–2013).

Early life
Clarke was raised in Dana Point, California. She is the daughter of actor John Clarke. One of three siblings, Clarke's sister, Heidi, died in 1994 of a malignant heart tumor.

Career 
Clarke appeared on the daytime soap opera Days of Our Lives as Faith Taylor (where her father was a senior cast member), and starred in the television series Soldier of Fortune, Inc. She also guest-starred on Xena: Warrior Princess as the Amazon chieftain Velasca, Firefly as the brothel madam Nandi, Charmed as the Siren, and has had six appearances on CSI where she played dominatrix Lady Heather. She also appeared in the Seinfeld episode "The Muffin Tops", playing Jerry's girlfriend who likes anything hairless. In 1993, she played a lead role in the horror film Return of the Living Dead 3.

She portrayed Julie Cooper in the teen drama series The O.C., that aired on the Fox network from August 5, 2003, to February 22, 2007, running a total of four seasons. Clarke's character Julie Cooper was often characterized as devious and selfish, with USA Today calling her a "shallow vixen". However, she revealed a more vulnerable side of herself a number of times during the series. Clarke was originally billed as a guest star in the first few episodes in which she appeared, but due to fan response was offered a series regular contract; Clarke accepted the role and her character became an integral part of the show's storylines.

In July 2009, Entertainment Weekly placed Clarke's The O.C. character Julie Cooper at No. 3 on their list of "21 Top TV Bitches". In January 2021, Vogue wrote about the fashion choices on The O.C., commenting: "Speaking of the Coopers, I also want to end by saying Julie Cooper (Melinda Clarke), Marissa's mom, is so underrated during this whole series. First of all, she's gorgeous. Secondly, she commands every single room she walks into, whether it's in a pink Juicy Couture tracksuit or a groovy, off-the-shoulder top. Clearly Marissa got all her fashion sense from her."

As well as starring on The O.C., she has appeared on HBO's comedy-drama series Entourage as a fictionalized version of herself, married to Malcolm McDowell's character Terrance McQuewick. Clarke portrayed Blithe Meacham in the television film She Drives Me Crazy (2007), which was produced by Kelly Rowan. She had guest roles in several television shows, including Chuck (2007), Reaper (2007) and Ghost Whisperer (2010). In 2010, she appeared on The CW show The Vampire Diaries as Kelly Donovan, a mother who discovers her daughter has died. Los Angeles Times praised her performance as Kelly by saying: "In a scene without any dialogue, Clarke made Kelly's grief believable and powerful."
In 2010, she landed one of the main roles in The CW's action drama series Nikita as Helen "Amanda" Collins. Clarke's character was the main antagonist in the show's third and fourth season. The series concluded after four seasons on December 27, 2013. She has lent her voice to several voice acting projects, voicing Alexa in The Animatrix: Matriculated, Sofia Ivanescu in the video game Mission Impossible: Operation Surma, Madame Macmu-Ling in Avatar: The Last Airbender, and Charlene in King of the Hill.

In April 2021, Clarke and her former The O.C. co-star Rachel Bilson launched a weekly podcast titled Welcome to the OC, Bitches! The podcast focuses on the hosts and guests re-watching and discussing episodes of The O.C. In August 2021, the podcast was named one of "7 Top Celebrity Podcasts You Should Subscribe To Right Now" by Bustle.

Public image 
Two action figures have been made of Clarke. The first was for her role as Jessica Priest in Spawn (1997) and the second was for her role as Velasca from the television series Xena: Warrior Princess (1997). In August 2005, TV Guide ranked her at No. 5 on their list of "TV's Top Ten Scene Stealers". Clarke has often portrayed characters that are tough, manipulative and villains. In 2011, she said that fans and viewers of Nikita wanted her character Amanda to be "evil" and "as bad as possible". Clarke described her The O.C. character Julie Cooper by saying: "You believe your character's truth—and her truth was maintaining this beautiful façade. Physically and monetarily. But ultimately she is an outsider, and that's what Josh has explained is the biggest theme of this show: everyone is really an outsider. They were one, or they become an outsider, or they feel like an outsider."

During her career, Clarke has appeared in magazine covers and pictorials such as In Touch Weekly, Fangoria and Regard magazine.

Personal life 
Clarke was married to Ernie Mirich from 1997 to 2005, and they have a daughter born in 2000. In September 2015, Clarke married Adam Farmer in a ceremony held in Dana Point, California.

Filmography

Film

Television

Video games

Podcast series

Music videos

Awards and nominations

References

External links

20th-century American actresses
21st-century American actresses
Actresses from California
American film actresses
American soap opera actresses
American television actresses
American voice actresses
Living people
People from Dana Point, California
1969 births